Louis Tewanima (1888 – January 18, 1969), also known as Tsökahovi Tewanima and Lewis Tewanima, was an American two-time Olympic distance runner and silver medalist in the 10,000 meter run in 1912.  He was a Hopi Indian and ran for the Carlisle Indian School where he was a teammate of Jim Thorpe. His silver medal in 1912 remained the best U.S. achievement in this event until another Native American, Billy Mills, won the gold medal in 1964. Tewanima also competed at the 1908 Olympics, where he finished in ninth place in the marathon.

Biography

Tewanima was a Hopi Native American, and spent nearly his entire life on a reservation in Arizona. In 1906, as a result of a dispute between the Hopi and U.S. Government over school education for children, Tewanima was sent to Fort Wingate in New Mexico and in 1907 to Carlisle Indian School, where he became a teammate of Jim Thorpe and won numerous long-distance races. Tewanima once ran the Boston Marathon, in 1909, but he failed to finish after leading the race for 18 miles.

After the 1912 Olympics Tewanima returned to his reservation and spent the rest of his life herding sheep, and growing crops. In 1954, he was selected for the all-time U.S. Olympic track & field team, and in 1957 inducted into the Arizona Sports Hall of Fame. Tewanima died after falling from a 70-foot cliff while returning home in the night.

Tewanima is a running legend to the Hopi tribe and there is a race dedicated to him every year on top of Second Mesa. The race is primarily a 10K and 5K which is held on the Sunday of Labor Day weekend.  The 10K and 5K courses start in the village on top of the mesa and follow a foot trail descends and circles around the mesa.  The 10K includes a 3-mile run through a riverbed.  The last part of both the 5K and 10K is a climb up stairs back to the top of the mesa where the finish line is located.  Among other great runners, Billy Mills has been sighted in attendance at this event called the Louis Tewanima Footrace.

See also
Hopi people
Native Americans in the United States

References

1888 births
1969 deaths
Hopi people
Native American sportspeople
American male long-distance runners
Olympic silver medalists for the United States in track and field
Athletes (track and field) at the 1908 Summer Olympics
Athletes (track and field) at the 1912 Summer Olympics
Carlisle Indian Industrial School alumni
Medalists at the 1912 Summer Olympics
20th-century Native Americans